The Student Intellectual Property Law Association (SIPLA) is an American voluntary association for law students with an interest in intellectual property (IP) law. SIPLA chapters typically are found at law schools with an intellectual property curriculum. There is no national SIPLA body and independent student chapters have formed to organize intellectual property-related events and provide law students networking and learning opportunities.

Typical SIPLA objectives 
Promote intellectual property issues across the law student community, to the state bar, and other audiences;
Expose members to the many facets of intellectual property, including patents, trademarks, and copyrights;
Provide a forum for open dialogue about current issues in intellectual property and how they might affect the future practice of intellectual property law; and
Promote rapport and engagement between intellectual property students and professionals.

SIPLA events 
SIPLA chapters organize networking and speaking events featuring influential IP professionals.

Active SIPLA chapters 
California Western School of Law
Case Western Reserve University School of Law
California Western School of Law
Cleveland-Marshall College of Law
Franklin Pierce Law Center, Pierce Chapter Blog
George Washington University Law School
J. Reuben Clark Law School
University of Nebraska College of Law
Santa Clara University School of Law
S.J. Quinney College of Law
St. Louis University School of Law
The University of Tennessee College of Law
Thomas M. Cooley Law School
University of Minnesota Law School
University of Pittsburgh School of Law
University of St. Thomas School of Law
William Mitchell College of Law
University of New Hampshire Franklin Pierce School of Law

External links
Student Intellectual Property Law Association Events Archive
Legal organizations based in the United States
Student organizations in the United States